The following is the 8th Council of State of the Republic of Cuba, which sat from 2013 to 2018.

Members of the 8th Council of State (2013–2018)

Government of Cuba